HMS Indomitable was a modified  built for the Royal Navy during World War II. Originally planned to be the fourth of the class, she was redesigned to enable her to operate more aircraft, 48 instead of 36. The lower hangar was made shorter than the upper hangar due to the need for extra workshops and accommodation to support the added aircraft.

Construction and early history

Indomitable was laid down by Vickers-Armstrong at Barrow-in-Furness, on 10 November 1937. She was launched on 26 March 1940 and commissioned the following year in October. She was christened by Clementine Churchill.

She sailed to the West Indies in November 1941 for her maiden voyage. While there, Indomitable ran aground on a coral reef near Jamaica, though she returned to service soon afterwards. This did mean she did not reach Southeast Asia in time to provide air cover for Force Z, a naval force sent to deter the Japanese from attacking Singapore. This force was sunk by Japanese aircraft when the Japanese landed in Malaya in December 1941. The following month, in January 1942, Indomitable joined the Eastern Fleet based at Ceylon (now Sri Lanka). At the end of January, she ferried 48 Royal Air Force Hawker Hurricanes to airfields in Sumatra in the Dutch East Indies, to reinforce the air defenses of Singapore, but a large proportion of the Hurricanes were destroyed on the ground by Japanese air raids. The British commanders in Singapore surrendered to the Japanese on 15 February.

After the fall of Britain's remaining Far Eastern colonies Hong Kong and Burma, Indomitable was redeployed. A new Eastern Fleet was established under the command of Admiral Sir James Somerville. Indomitable, and her sister ship  were the only modern aircraft carriers of the Fleet, and were a vital asset to the Allies in the Far East; the only other carrier, was obsolete.

In April 1942 Somerville attempted to intercept the Japanese carrier strike force during their Indian Ocean raid. Incomplete intelligence led him to abandon his ambush just hours before the Japanese force arrived. Over the next few days Indomitable was part of a force that attempted to intercept the Japanese fleet at night, where the slow but radar-equipped British torpedo planes would have the best chance of a successful strike. Despite several days of searching no decisive action was achieved and Somerville eventually withdrew his fast carriers to Bombay.

In May 1942 the British launched Operation Ironclad, the invasion of French Madagascar. It was feared that the Japanese would themselves occupy Madagascar and use it as a submarine base to attack Allied convoy routes in the Indian Ocean.

Indomitable was detached from the Eastern Fleet to take part in the invasion, rendezvousing with the covering force (which included sister ship ) and the invasion force which had been sent from Durban, South Africa. The assault began on 5 May at Courrier Bay, just west of the actual objective of Diego Suarez. Indomitables air wing attacked Arrachart airfield on the opening day of the invasion, destroying five Morane-Saulnier M.S.406 fighters and damaging two more as well as two Potez 63.11s. The following day a ground assault began, with Indomitables Albacores bombing the defences and her Fulmars and Sea Hurricanes flying ground attack sorties. French forces in Diego Suarez surrendered on 7 May.

The Mediterranean

In July, Indomitable returned to the United Kingdom. She was soon back in action, participating in Operation Pedestal, the largest convoy to supply the besieged island of Malta.

During the operation Indomitable was hit by two 500 kg bombs (by Ju 87s belonging to StG 3) and suffered three near misses. One 500 kg bomb penetrated the unarmoured portion of the flight deck, causing damage that required her to withdraw for repairs, although she was able to steam at  fewer than two hours after the hits. Casualties were 6 officers and 40 ratings killed, and 70 ratings wounded.    (The attack may be viewed at the seventeen-minute mark of the documentary Malta Convoy listed in the external links section). She sailed to the United States, where repairs were completed in February 1943, after which she immediately returned to the Mediterranean. 

She was torpedoed by a Savoia-Marchetti SM.79 of 204a Squadriglia of the 41° Torpedo Bomber Group on 16 July while supporting the buildup for the Allied invasion of Sicily (Operation Husky) and returned again to the United States, where repairs were completed. She commenced sea trials 10 April 1944.

The Far East
Indomitable returned to the Eastern Fleet in early 1944.  She and Victorious launched bombers against Sumatra in August and September. They later bombed the Nicobar Islands, after which Indomitable joined up with Illustrious to attack Medan and Sumatra again on 20 December. The following year, Indomitable joined the British Pacific Fleet. On 4 January 1945 she, her sister ship Victorious and another fleet carrier  attacked Medan. Subsequent actions were taken against Palembang and Sumatra, later in January. On 4 May 1945 she was hit by a kamikaze, but her armoured flight deck saved her from serious damage. In August, with the war ending, Indomitable supported the liberation of Hong Kong, arriving after a landing party from  had taken the Japanese surrender. Her aircraft flew the carrier's last combat missions of the war and of her career on 31 August and 1 September against Japanese suicide boats which were attacking British forces.

Post-war
Indomitable returned to the UK in November 1945. The following year she carried the Great Britain national rugby league team to Australia on their first post-war tour, earning the team the nickname, 'The Indomitables'. In 1947, she was placed in reserve, and then given a refit that took three years, from 1947 to 1950. Late in her refit her boilers were discovered to have only 10 years of life, and the engine spaces had to be torn apart and rebuilt to replace the boilers. Upon the completion of her refit she returned to operational duty with the Home Fleet in far cooler climates than her wartime operations.

In 1951, Indomitable replaced the Royal Navy's last battleship, as the Home Fleet flagship. On 3 February 1953, she was badly damaged by an internal fire and explosion; the damage was later covered in concrete and never repaired. In the same year, she sailed to take part in the Fleet Review to celebrate the Coronation of Queen Elizabeth II. She then did deck landings in the Channel, with experimental landing lights replacing the batsman. This would require tearing the ship down to the hangar deck itself. Given the escalating costs of the modernization of her half-sister Victorious, the Admiralty decided against a complete modernization for a ship of her age.

Decommissioning and disposal
Indomitable returned to the reserve fleet, and in October 1953 she was placed in unmaintained reserve. She was sold for scrap and arrived at Faslane for breaking up on 30 September 1955.

Notes

Bibliography

External links

 Armoured aircraft carrier action and damage reports, 1940-1945
 cutaway in Flight magazine 1951
 Maritimequest HMS Indomitable photo gallery
 Fleet Air Arm entry for Indomitable
 Leading Air Mechanic Maurice Whiteing and his photographic record of HMS Indomitable in the Indian and Pacific Oceans, 1944-45
 INDOMITABLE fleet aircraft carrier (1941)
 DAMAGE CONTROL FOR REAL!
 PEDESTAL: HMS Indomitable bombed - Malta Convoy 1942 at YouTube
 HMS Indomitable, Damage Control, Operation Pedestal convoy bomb damage, August 12, 1942

 

Illustrious-class aircraft carriers
Ships built in Barrow-in-Furness
1940 ships
World War II aircraft carriers of the United Kingdom
Cold War aircraft carriers of the United Kingdom